Luke Milton (born 1982) is a former rugby league and rugby union footballer.

He is also a celebrity trainer on Revenge Body with Khloé Kardashian.

Background
Milton was born in Paddington, New South Wales, Australia

Playing career
Milton came through the Roosters lower grades and represented Australia at a junior level before making his first grade debut in 2001. He had a season at the Wests Tigers club in the 2003 season before switching rugby codes to play for the NSW Waratahs in rugby union.

He played with New York Athletic Club (NYAC) Rugby in the United States Super League in 2008 and led the team to a national championship, winning the title game in sudden death with a 55-meter penalty.

Luke attended Lucas Heights Community School in his early high school years and attended Bangor Primary.

References

 

1982 births
Living people
Australian rugby league players
Australian rugby union players

Rugby league players from Sydney
Sydney Roosters players
Wests Tigers players